People with the surname Linscott include:

Eloise Hubbard Linscott (1897-1978), American folklorist
Gillian Linscott (born 27 September 1944), British author
Glenda Linscott (born 6 September 1958), Anglo-Australian actress and director
Jody Linscott (fl. 20th–21st centuries), Anglo-American musician and author